Charles Philip Yorke  (12 March 1764 – 13 March 1834) was a British politician. He notably served as Home Secretary from 1803 to 1804.

Political career
He sat as a Member of Parliament (MP) for Cambridgeshire from 1790 to 1810.
He was commissioned as an officer in the Cambridgeshire Militia in 1793. He was promoted to major in 1795, a fellow officer was Captain George Manby By 1806 he was their colonel.
He was MP for Liskeard from 1812 to 1818. 

In 1801 he was appointed Secretary at War in Henry Addington's ministry, transferring to the Home Office in 1803, where he was a strong opponent of concession to the Roman Catholics. He made himself exceedingly unpopular in 1810 by bringing about the exclusion of strangers, including reporters for the press, from the House of Commons under the standing order, which led to the imprisonment of Sir Francis Burdett, 5th Baronet in the Tower and to riots in London. In the same year, Yorke joined Spencer Perceval's government as First Lord of the Admiralty. He retired from public life in 1818.

He was elected a Fellow of the Royal Society in 1801.

Family
Yorke was the second son of the Hon. Charles Yorke and grandson of Philip Yorke, 1st Earl of Hardwicke. His mother was Agneta, daughter of Henry Johnstone. His brother was Admiral Sir Joseph Sidney Yorke (1768–1831), whose son succeeded to the earldom of Hardwicke.

Yorke married Harriott, eldest daughter of Charles Manningham, Esq. of Thorpe, Surrey in July 1790. They had no children. He died in March 1834, one day after his 70th birthday.

He had a natural son, Charles Eurwicke Douglas.

Legacy
In 1802, Matthew Flinders named Yorke Peninsula in South Australia after Yorke.

References

External links

1764 births
1834 deaths
Alumni of St John's College, Cambridge
Secretaries of State for the Home Department
Lords of the Admiralty
Tory MPs (pre-1834)
Members of the Parliament of Great Britain for English constituencies
British MPs 1790–1796
British MPs 1796–1800
Members of the Parliament of the United Kingdom for English constituencies
Members of the Parliament of the United Kingdom for St Germans
Members of the Privy Council of the United Kingdom
UK MPs 1801–1802
UK MPs 1802–1806
UK MPs 1806–1807
UK MPs 1807–1812
UK MPs 1812–1818
Charles Philip
Fellows of the Royal Society
Members of the Parliament of the United Kingdom for Liskeard